Jamie Delgado and Jonathan Marray were the defending champions but decided not to participate together.
Delgado played alongside Ken Skupski, finishing runner-up.  Marray partnered up with Dustin Brown, reaching the semifinals.
Martin Fischer and Philipp Oswald won the title, defeating Delgado and Skupski 6–4, 6–4 in the final.

Seeds

Draw

Draw

References
 Main Draw

Aegon GB Pro-Series Bath - Doubles
2012 Doubles